Chrysozephyrus kirbariensis, the Kirbari hairstreak, is a small butterfly found in India that belongs to the lycaenids or blues family.

Taxonomy
The butterfly was previously classified as Thecla kirbariensis Tytler.

Range
The butterfly occurs in India from Assam, Manipur, Nagaland and onto Myanmar.

Status
In 1932 William Harry Evans described the species as rare.

See also
List of butterflies of India (Lycaenidae)

Cited references

References
  
 
 

Chrysozephyrus
Butterflies of Asia